Paul Johnson may refer to:

Musicians
Paul Johnson (producer) (1971–2021), American producer and DJ
Paul Johnson (singer), British soul singer of the 1980s
Paul Johnson (guitarist), American
Paul Francis Johnson, Australian bassist, frontman of Mr Floppy and Poontang

Government and politics
Paul Johnson (American politician) (born 1959), former mayor of Phoenix, Arizona
Paul Johnson (Canadian politician) (born 1952), former Ontario Member of Provincial Parliament
Paul Johnson (civil servant), city manager of Toronto since 2022
Paul B. Johnson Jr. (1916–1985), American politician, governor of Mississippi 1964–1968
Paul B. Johnson Sr. (1880–1943), American politician, governor of Mississippi 1940–1943
Paul Johnson (United States Air Force) (born 1958), USAF general and Distinguished Service Cross recipient

Scholars and clergy
K. Paul Johnson (born 1953), library director and writer
Paul Johnson (economist) (born 1967), British civil servant and economist
Paul Johnson (writer) (1928–2023), British journalist and historian
Paul E. Johnson (born 1942), American historian, and professor emeritus at University of South Carolina
Paul S. L. Johnson (1873–1950), American scholar and pastor, the founder of the Laymen's Home Missionary Movement
Paul V. Johnson (born 1954), American leader in The Church of Jesus Christ of Latter-day Saints

Sportspeople
Paul Johnson (American football) (born 1957), American football coach
Paul Johnson (Australian footballer, born 1962), Australian rules footballer for North Melbourne in 1984
Paul Johnson (Australian footballer, born 1984), Australian rules footballer in the 2000s
Paul Johnson (baseball) (1896–1973), American Major League outfielder
Paul Johnson (cricketer) (born 1965), English cricketer
Paul Johnson (footballer, born 1955), English footballer
Paul Johnson (footballer, born 1959), English footballer
Paul Johnson (footballer, born 1992), English footballer
Paul Johnson (ice hockey) (1935–2016), American ice hockey player
Paul Johnson (rugby league, born 1970), New Zealand rugby league player
Paul Johnson (rugby league, born 1978), English rugby league player
Paul Johnson (rugby league, born 1988), English rugby league player
Paul Johnson (squash player) (born 1972), English squash player
Paul Johnson (wheelchair athlete) (1966–2020), Canadian wheelchair tennis player

Other
Paul Johnson, alias Paul America (1944–1982), American colleague of Andy Warhol
Paul Johnson (book artist) (born 1943), British book artist and paper engineer
Paul Johnson (comics) (born 1958), British comics artist
Paul Johnson (philanthropist) (1929–2015), Canadian philanthropist
Paul Marshall Johnson Jr. (1955–2004), American murdered hostage

See also
Paul Johnston (disambiguation)
Paul Johnstone (disambiguation)